Liling East railway station is a railway station of Hangchangkun Passenger Railway located in Hunan, People's Republic of China.

See also
Liling railway station

Railway stations in Hunan